Jones Business College, also known as the Jones Building, is a historic building located in Perry, Iowa, United States.   C. Durant Jones was a social activist who supported the cause of Prohibition. Jones developed and promoted the "Jones Chautauqua System," which was a series of Chautauqua-style productions that promoted the temperance movement across Iowa in the 1910s. He also owned and operated a normal school and a commercial school.  All three of these ventures were operated from this building from 1913, when it was built, until 1921.  The foundation and walls of this structure are composed of poured concrete, a reaction to the fires that plagued Perry.  After its academic and administration use, the building was converted into apartments.  It was added to the National Register of Historic Places in 2000.

References

School buildings completed in 1913
Perry, Iowa
Apartment buildings in Iowa
School buildings on the National Register of Historic Places in Iowa
Buildings and structures in Dallas County, Iowa
National Register of Historic Places in Dallas County, Iowa
1913 establishments in Iowa